Michael Henderson Spence  (30 December 1936 – 7 May 1968) was a British racing driver from England. He participated in 37 Formula One World Championship Grands Prix, debuting on 8 September 1963. He achieved one podium, and scored a total of 27 championship points. He also participated in numerous non-Championship Formula One races, as well as sports car racing.

Early career
Spence was born in Purley, Surrey, and began his motorsport career driving his father's Turner and an AC Ace sports car. Spence moved into open-wheel racing in Formula Junior in 1960. He retired early from the Solitude race with a gearbox failure, but finished second behind Tony Marsh's BRM in the Lewis-Evans Trophy. These results prompted moves to the privateer Ian Walker Racing FJ team for 1962, driving a Lotus 22, and then to the works Lotus Formula Junior squad in 1963.

Despite disappointing results in his first Formula Junior season with a major team, with fourth place in the British Grand Prix FJ support race his best result, towards the end of  Spence was called up to the Lotus Formula One team, taking the place of the injured Trevor Taylor at the Italian Grand Prix. Driving the Lotus 25, Spence qualified ninth and was classified 13th in the race despite the car's oil pressure fading near the end, while team-mate Jim Clark took the win and with it the Drivers' Championship.

Formula One
However, shortly before the British Grand Prix, Arundell suffered a severe accident in an F2 race at Reims-Gueux, and Spence was called up to replace him in the F1 team for the rest of the season. Driving both the Lotus 25 and the Lotus 33, Spence managed points finishes in two World Championship races, sixth in Italy and fourth at the season finale in Mexico. This gave him four points, placing him equal 12th in the Drivers' Championship.

But over the rest of the Championship, while Clark won his second Drivers' title with ease, Spence could only record two more points finishes, coming fourth again in Britain and third in the season finale in Mexico, behind American duo Richie Ginther and Dan Gurney, in what would turn out to be his only podium finish in a Championship race. With ten points, he was eighth in the Drivers' Championship.

The  season began with victory in another non-Championship race, in South Africa. However, Lotus boss Colin Chapman then took back the recovered Arundell, leaving Spence out of a drive. Before the Championship began in May at Monaco, Spence signed for the privateer Reg Parnell Racing team, but the BRM-powered Lotus 25 he drove was elderly and unreliable and he finished only twice, in the Netherlands and Italy, although he was fifth on both occasions. The four points thus earned placed him 13th in the Drivers' Championship.

At the end of 1966, Graham Hill left the works BRM team to join Lotus, and Spence was chosen as his replacement. Driving the BRM P83 over the course of the  Championship, Spence achieved points finishes in five races, though these consisted of four fifths and a sixth. He thus finished tenth in the Drivers' Championship with nine points.

Sports car racing

In 1967, Jim Hall hired Spence as part of his Chaparral sports car team. One of the most innovative engineers in 1960s motorsport, Hall pioneered many advances in racing technology. For 1967 the great advance was the addition of aerodynamic wings to the rear of his cars, generating extra downforce to improve grip levels and hence cornering speeds. Driving the Chaparral 2F with regular partner Phil Hill, Spence managed to make a great impression on the sports car scene. Fastest laps in the 12 Hours of Sebring and 1000km Spa races were just the prelude to a dominant win in the 1967 BOAC 500 race at Brands Hatch. Spence and Hill finished half a lap ahead of the Jackie Stewart/Chris Amon Ferrari 330P, who were themselves three laps ahead of everybody else.

For 1968 Spence moved to the Ford-backed Alan Mann Racing team. He became one of the few people ever to drive the ill-fated Ford P68 in competition, although an engine mount failure on his own entry, followed by a driveshaft failure on the team's second car during the race, prevented Spence from reaching the chequered flag.

Death

Following Clark's death at Hockenheim in early April 1968, Colin Chapman invited Spence back to Lotus as part of their Indianapolis 500 team, with the race in late May. Spence was due to race the revolutionary Lotus 56 gas turbine car. During practice at the Indianapolis Motor Speedway on Tuesday, 7 May, Spence, driving the #60 Lotus 56 turbocar (later qualified and driven by Joe Leonard), ran a lap of  – fastest of the month and second-fastest in track history.

Later in the afternoon, Colin Chapman was asked by Andy Granatelli if Spence could take out turbocar #30 for a test run after driver Greg Weld had difficulty getting the car up to speed. The right-front wheel of the Lotus swiveled backwards into the cockpit and struck Spence on the helmet; he died in the hospital later that evening at 9:45 pm from massive head injuries. His fastest lap speed set earlier that day was unsurpassed for the next five practice days.

Racing record

Complete Formula One World Championship results 
(key) 

1Shared drive with Jim Clark.
2The Parnell Lotus driven by Spence in 1966 was a written-off 25 rebuilt around a 33 monocoque.

Non-Championship results
(key) (Races in bold indicate pole position)
(Races in italics indicate fastest lap)

1The Parnell Lotus driven by Spence in 1966 was a written-off 25 rebuilt around a 33 monocoque.

24 Hours of Le Mans results

References

Biography at the Autocourse Grand Prix Archive
Brief biography at gpracing192.net
Formula One Championship and non-Championship results from GEL Motorsport Information
World Sportscar Championship results at wspr-racing.com
"Mike Spence: Out of the Shadows" by Richard Jenkins published 2021 ISBN 978-0-9576450-9-7

See also

List of Indianapolis fatalities

1936 births
1968 deaths
English racing drivers
English Formula One drivers
Filmed deaths in motorsport
Team Lotus Formula One drivers
BRM Formula One drivers
Reg Parnell Racing Formula One drivers
Racing drivers who died while racing
Sports deaths in Indiana
24 Hours of Le Mans drivers
World Sportscar Championship drivers
People from Croydon